Kostelec is a municipality and village in Tachov District in the Plzeň Region of the Czech Republic. It has about 600 inhabitants.

Administrative parts
Villages of Lšelín, Nedražice, Ostrov u Stříbra, Popov and Vrhaveč are administrative parts of Kostelec.

Gallery

References

Villages in Tachov District